Pihem is a commune in the Pas-de-Calais department in the Hauts-de-France region of France.

Geography
Pihem lies about 5 miles (8 km) south of Saint-Omer, on the D195 road.

Population

Places of interest
 The church of St.Pierre, dating from the sixteenth century.
 The remains of a château.

See also
Communes of the Pas-de-Calais department

References

External links

 A Pihem village website 

Communes of Pas-de-Calais